Ronald Forfar (6 January 1939 – 28 September 2020) was a British actor who appeared in many roles since the 1970s, including the role of Freddie Boswell in Carla Lane's comedy Bread.

Biography

Forfar was born in January 1939 in Liverpool, Merseyside, England, UK. He was educated at Liverpool Collegiate, then was seven years in the Royal Navy before training at RADA from 1965 to 1967. He played a tragedian in Rosencrantz and Guildenstern Are Dead in 1966. Other parts include a tax inspector, Costello The Second, in Alan Bleasdale's The Muscle Market (a Boys from the Blackstuff prequel) and The Soothsayer in Herbert Wise's BBC television adaption of Julius Caesar. Shakespearian roles include Bates in Henry V and First Officer in Laurence Olivier's version of King Lear.

He also appeared in The Sweeney, Tutti Frutti, Chucklevision (as 'Professor Frimley'), The New Avengers and Graham Chapman's film Yellowbeard. He had three brothers, two of whom pre-deceased him.

In 2018 Ronald worked on what would be his last project, a short film called The All-Nighter, written and directed by Lee Phillips, and co-starring Erkan Mustafa and Martin Hancock.

Forfar died on 28 September 2020, aged 81.

References

External links

Ronald Forfar at BBC Comedy Guide
Shakespeare in Performance discusses 1978 adaption of Julius Caesar

Male actors from Liverpool
1939 births
2020 deaths
British male stage actors
British male television actors
20th-century British male actors
21st-century British male actors
Alumni of RADA